The Albertus L. Meyers Bridge, also known as the Eighth Street Bridge, the South Eighth Street Viaduct, and unsigned as SR 2055, is a reinforced concrete open-spandrel arch bridge located in Allentown, Pennsylvania. The bridge is "one of the earliest surviving examples of monumental, reinforced concrete construction," according to the American Society of Civil Engineers.

Upon its opening on November 17, 1913, the bridge, then known as the Eighth Street Bridge, was the longest and highest concrete bridge in the world.

The bridge spans the Little Lehigh Creek, linking center city Allentown with Allentown's South Side. The bridge has seventeen spans and is longer than the more massive Tunkhannock Viaduct of the same type.

History

Planning and development
In 1911, the Lehigh Valley Transit Company in Allentown organized the Allentown Bridge Company for the sole purpose of "erecting, constructing and maintaining a bridge and approaches thereto over the Little Lehigh Creek."  The bridge was designed by the engineering firm of Benjamin H. Davis and built by McArthur Brothers of New York City. 

The bridge spans the Little Lehigh Creek for a total length of 2,600'-0". It is an average of 38'-0" feet wide with two 16-0" travel lanes and two sidewalks. The main structure spanning Little Lehigh Creek consists of nine open-spandrel concrete deck arch spans, and there are eight closed-spandrel concrete deck arch approach spans.

Opening
Upon its November 17, 1913 opening, the bridge, then known as the Eighth Street Bridge, was the longest and highest concrete bridge in the world.

From its opening until the 1950s, the structure operated as a toll bridge with an automobile toll of five cents.

Electric street car service
The Liberty Bell Line, Lehigh Valley Transit's electric street car line, which ran from Allentown to Quakertown, Sellersville, Lansdale, Norristown and Philadelphia, ran across the bridge until that interurban service was discontinued on September 6, 1951.  The concrete standards that once supported the trolley wire are still standing on the bridge to this day.

Albertus L. Meyers Bridge renaming
In 1974, the Eighth Street Bridge was formally renamed the Albertus L. Meyers Bridge in honor of Albertus L. Meyers, a well-known conductor of the Allentown Band and a cornet player in John Philip Sousa's band. As a boy, Meyers played in the Allentown Band at the 1913 opening of the bridge that now bears his name.

National Register of Historic Places designation
On June 22, 1988, the Albertus L. Meyers Bridge was added to the U.S. National Register of Historic Places.

Bridge suicides
In the Lehigh Valley area, the phrase "I'm going to jump off the Eighth Street Bridge" is used variously and kiddingly when facing a seemingly insurmountable challenge or challenges.

Since its 1913 opening, the bridge has been the source for at least 80 documented suicides and an unknown number of suicide attempts. These suicides have become a part of the local culture with claims of ghost sightings on the bridge and a variety of unauthorized makeshift memorials beneath the bridge. The first documented suicide was in 1915 when William C. Kleinsmith, an unemployed boilermaker, jumped off the bridge to his death. 

In 2020, seeking to discourage suicidal jumps from the bridge, the city considered adding barriers to make jumping more difficult.

See also
List of bridges documented by the Historic American Engineering Record in Pennsylvania
List of historic places in Allentown, Pennsylvania

References

External links

Albertus L. Meyers Bridge at HistoricBridges.org

1913 establishments in Pennsylvania
Bridges completed in 1913
Bridges in Lehigh County, Pennsylvania
Buildings and structures in Allentown, Pennsylvania
Concrete bridges in the United States
Former toll bridges in Pennsylvania
Historic American Engineering Record in Pennsylvania
History of Allentown, Pennsylvania
National Register of Historic Places in Lehigh County, Pennsylvania
Railroad bridges on the National Register of Historic Places in Pennsylvania
Reportedly haunted locations in Pennsylvania
Road bridges on the National Register of Historic Places in Pennsylvania
Road-rail bridges in the United States
Viaducts in the United States